Clifford Herring (13 October 1913 – 1997) was an English footballer who played in the Football League for Mansfield Town.

References

1913 births
1997 deaths
English footballers
Association football midfielders
English Football League players
Ollerton Colliery F.C. players
Mansfield Town F.C. players